The  (Second Automobile Manufacturer Private Limited), usually abbreviated to Perodua, is Malaysia's largest car manufacturer,
followed by Proton.

History 
It was established in 1992 and launched its first car, the Perodua Kancil, in August 1994. 'M2'  refers to the codename which was used when the project to establish Perodua was still top secret. Initially Perodua mainly produced minicars and superminis, and did not have models in the same market segments as Proton. In recent years, however, its targeted market segments have started to overlap with Proton's – especially in the supercompact segment, where the Perodua Myvi has fought off the Proton Savvy and is now competing with the Proton Iriz.

Perodua does not design or engineer its main components, such as engines and transmissions, in house. The cars have historically used Daihatsu component designs. Daihatsu held a 20% stake in Perodua at the company's launch, increasing this to 25% in 2001 and then to 35%. In 2004 Perodua started assembling the Toyota Avanza at its plant in Rawang, for sale in Malaysia.

Perodua sold more than 207,100 vehicles in 2016, which was its highest-ever yearly sales record, and achieved a highest-ever market share of 35.7%. The company is planning to set up a second car manufacturing plant with a planned $770 million investment in the coming years.

Perodua's shareholders currently include the UMW Corporation (38%), Daihatsu Motor Co. (20%), Daihatsu (Malaysia) (5%), MBM Resources (20%), PNB Equity Resource Corporation (10%), Mitsui & Co. (4.2%) and Mitsui & Co. (Asia Pacific) (2.8%).

Sales

Domestic 
Perodua is expected to become the largest manufacturer of subcompact cars in Southeast Asia. By October 2005, it had produced a cumulative total of 1 million cars. By July 2008, it increased its manufacturing output to 240,000 per year.

Compared to Proton, Perodua has been quite successful in its business ventures. The automobile manufacturer is popular in Malaysia, with the Perodua Myvi having sold 80,327 units in 2006, outselling its rival's best selling car, then the Proton Wira, which sold only 28,886 units in Malaysia. In the period 2006–2010 Perodua was the best-selling car company in Malaysia. In the first half of 2011, however, Proton overtook Perodua to become the best-selling brand. It was many years since the first national carmaker had been the best-seller, and though part of the reason was that Perodua's supply in the second quarter was limited (due to phasing-out of the old Myvi) and also the problems caused by the amendments to the H-P Act, it has to be said that Proton's current line-up has drawn many customers, notably the core models Proton Saga and Proton Persona. Proton delivered 85,223 units to take a 28.7% share of the TIV while Perodua delivered 79,467 units, a difference of 5,756 units.

International 
In the United Kingdom, Perodua's cars were sold by some Proton dealers who wished to attract customers seeking a smaller and cheaper alternative to the Proton range. Sales numbers in the UK were small, however, and in 2008 Perodua sold only 624 cars (down from 914 in 2002) – insignificant compared to other brands. Sales were up slightly in 2009 (to 650) and then to 761 in 2010, mainly due to the new Perodua Myvi selling comparatively well.

Currently, Perodua cars are exported to Singapore, Brunei, Mauritius, Fiji, Sri Lanka, and Seychelles. The company also exported the Myvi as the Daihatsu Sirion to Indonesia, which makes up for 55 percent of their exports in 2020.

On December 6, 2021, the company has studied whether exporting used Perodua cars overseas from Malaysia would be feasible.

Models

Current models

Former models 
 Perodua Kancil (1994–2009; A-segment hatchback, based on the Daihatsu Mira L200)
 Perodua Rusa (1996–2007; microvan, based on the Daihatsu Zebra)
 Perodua Kembara (1998–2007; A-segment SUV, based on the Daihatsu Terios J100)
 Perodua Kenari (2000–2009; A-segment hatchback, based on the Daihatsu Move L900)
 Perodua Kelisa (2001–2007; A-segment hatchback, based on the Daihatsu Mira L700)
 Perodua Viva (2007–2014; A-segment hatchback, based on the Daihatsu Mira L250)
 Perodua Nautica (2008–2009; A-segment SUV, based on the Daihatsu Terios J200)

Slogans

Corporate slogan 
 "Kehebatan Yang Pasti" (Excellence That Assured) (1997–2008)
"Happy Motoring" (2000–2008)
 "Building Cars, People First" (2008–present)

Anniversary slogan 
 10 Years of Excellence (Perodua's 10th anniversary slogan in 2003)
 20 Years of Driving Value and Beyond (Perodua's 20th anniversary slogan in 2013)

Logo 

Perodua organised a competition in 1997 to find a new corporate logo, to be launched together with their upcoming model, tentatively known as the X555. The competition was won by Johnson Ng Weng Kuan, an architecture student from Universiti Teknologi Malaysia. Perodua officially launched the new corporate logo on 24 August 1998 when they launched Malaysia's first 4x4 vehicle, the Perodua Kembara.

The new logo maintains the 'P' and '2' and the colours of the old, squarish logo, but has been stylised further to become elliptical, which is more fluid and dynamic. The green colour represents social responsibility to the environment and the community, while the red colour symbolises the development of a competent workforce and resilience in meeting challenges in the globalised world. However, the emblems mounted on the company's latest cars have black in place of the green and red areas, with the chrome relief maintained as it was.

Awards and accolades 
 People's Choice, Automotive Category (Bronze) - Putra Brands Awards 2010
 People's Choice, Automotive Category (Silver) - Putra Brands Awards 2012, 2015 & 2016
 Most Favorite Brand Automotive Sedan/Compact Cars - The BrandLaureate Bestbrands Award 2016—2017
 People's Choice, Automotive Category (Gold) - Putra Brands Awards 2017 & 2018

References

External links 
 

1992 establishments in Malaysia
Car manufacturers of Malaysia
Vehicle manufacturing companies established in 1993
Malaysian brands
Government-owned companies of Malaysia
Privately held companies of Malaysia
Car brands